The 70s was a decade that ran from January 1, AD 70, to December 31, AD 79.

As the decade began, the First Jewish–Roman War continued: In AD 70, the Romans besieged and sacked Jerusalem and destroyed the Second Temple. After this major victory, the Romans continued to clear pockets of Jewish resistance, with the final stronghold taken being Masada (73). The Flavian dynasty, which included emperors Vespasian and Titus, ruled the empire during this decade. During their reign, the Romans faced military challenges from various sources, including clashes with British and Germanic tribes. However, the Romans were largely successful in defeating these tribes, expanding their territories and consolidating their power. Following the death of Vologases I in 78, Parthia saw internal conflict as Vologases II and Pacorus II competed for the throne. In China, the Han–Xiongnu War was re-invigorated, with the Han defeating the Northern Xiongnu in the Battle of Yiwulu (73). In 75, Emperor Ming of Han died, being succeeded by Emperor Zhang: the reign of these two emperors is considered to have been a golden age.

The destruction of Jerusalem and the Second Temple during the First Jewish–Roman War marked a major turning point in Jewish history. The loss of mother-city and temple necessitated a reshaping of Jewish culture to ensure its survival. Judaism's Temple-based sects, including the priesthood and the Sadducees, diminished in importance. A new form of Judaism that became known as Rabbinic Judaism developed out of Pharisaic school and, centuries later, eventually became the mainstream form of the religion. Many followers of Jesus of Nazareth also survived the city's destruction. They spread his teachings across the Roman Empire, giving rise to the new religion of Christianity.

The event destroyed several towns and minor settlements in the area, at the time part of the Roman Empire. Pompeii and Herculaneum, obliterated and buried underneath massive pyroclastic surges and ashfall deposits, are the most famous examples. The total population of both cities was over 20,000. The remains of over 1,500 people have been found at Pompeii and Herculaneum so far, although the total death toll from the eruption remains unknown.

The period also saw significant architectural and engineering accomplishments, such as the construction of the Colosseum in Rome. In 75, Vespasian erected a colossal statue of Apollo, begun under Nero, and he dedicated a stage of the theatre of Marcellus. Valerius Flaccus wrote the Argonautica, an epic poem. Pliny the Elder composed the 10-volume Natural History, covering topics including astronomy, mathematics, geography, ethnography, anthropology, human physiology, zoology, botany, agriculture, horticulture, pharmacology, mining, mineralogy, sculpture, art, and precious stones.

Manning (2008) tentatively estimates the world population in AD 70 to have been 250 million.

Significant people
 Titus Flavius Vespasianus, Roman Emperor (Vespasian, AD 69–79)
 Titus Flavius Vespasianus, Roman Emperor (Titus, AD 79–81)

References